Tony Abbott (born 1957) is the former prime minister of Australia.

Tony Abbott or Anthony Abbott may also refer to:

Tony Abbott (Alberta politician) (born 1966), member of the legislature of Alberta, Canada
Tony Abbott (author) (born 1952), American author of children's books
Tony Abbott (diplomat) (born 1941), British diplomat and former Governor of Montserrat
Tony Abbott (Ontario politician) (born 1930), former federal Canadian cabinet minister
Anthony S. Abbott (1935–2020), Professor at Davidson College and writer

See also
Anthony Abbot (1893–1952), pseudonym of Fulton Oursler, American fiction author